Stadionul Comunal is a multi-purpose stadium in Blejoi, Romania. It is currently used mostly for football matches, is the home ground of CS Blejoi and has a capacity of 1,500 seats.

References

External links
Stadionul Comunal (Blejoi) at soccerway.com

Football venues in Romania
Sport in Prahova County
Buildings and structures in Prahova County